Line 14 of Zhengzhou Metro is a rapid transit line in Zhengzhou. The line uses 6-car Type B trains.

Phase 1 of Line 14 is 7.455 km in length with 6 stations. The line was opened on 19 September 2019.

Opening timeline

Stations

Legend
 - Stations in operation.
 - Stations under construction.

References

Line 14, Zhengzhou Metro
Railway lines opened in 2019
2019 establishments in China
Zhengzhou Metro lines